Chilly is a commune in the Ardennes department in northern France.

Geography
The Sormonne flows through the commune and forms part of its western border.

Population

See also
Communes of the Ardennes department

References

Communes of Ardennes (department)
Ardennes communes articles needing translation from French Wikipedia